The One Hundred Thirty-Second Ohio General Assembly was a meeting of the Ohio state legislature, composed of the Ohio State Senate and the Ohio House of Representatives. It convened in Columbus, Ohio on January 3, 2017 and adjourned December 31, 2018. The apportionment of legislative districts was based on the 2010 United States census and 2011 redistricting plan. Both the Ohio Senate and Ohio House of Representatives were retained by the Ohio Republican Party.

Senate

House of Representatives

See also
 List of Ohio state legislatures

References

Ohio legislative sessions
Ohio
Ohio
2017 in Ohio
2018 in Ohio